Eutrixa is a genus of bristle flies in the family Tachinidae. There are at least two described species in Eutrixa.

Species
 Eutrixa exilis (Coquillett, 1895)
 Eutrixa laxifrons Reinhard, 1962

References

Further reading

External links

 

Dexiinae
Taxa named by Daniel William Coquillett